Ushmey Chakraborty is an Indian filmmaker, actor, and screenwriter. He is the son of actors Mithun Chakraborty and Yogeeta Bali.

Early life
Ushmey was born to Mithun Chakraborty and Yogeeta Bali in Mumbai. He is the second son of Mithun. He has two brothers, Mimoh and Namashi Chakraborty and a sister Dishani Chakraborty.

He also attended the New York Film Academy.

Career
He started his career as an actor in the film Phir Kabhi (2008), playing younger version of Mithun Chakraborty’s character.

He then made his directorial debut with film titled Life, Somewhere in 2010, which he also written and produced. The film won the Royal Reel Award from the Canada International Film Festival in 2011.

In 2013, his another directorial Lucky Man was released. The film also starred Amruta Subhash in key role.

He then made a short film in 2017 titled Holy Smoke!, it starred his siblings, Mimoh, Namashi and Dishani in pivotal roles. The film was streamed on Vimeo.

In 2022, his another short film Gay, Asian, Immigrant. It was screened at Dances With Films, an annual independent film festival located in Los Angeles, California. This film was also the official selection at the 40th Outfest Los Angeles LGBTQ Film Festival.

Filmography

As assistant director 
 Enemmy (2013)
 Ishqedarriyaan (2015)

Awards
 In 2011, Ushmey won the Royal Reel Award by the Canada International Film Festival for his film Life Somewhere.

References

External links
 

Indian actors
Living people
Indian male film actors
Film producers from Mumbai
Film directors from Mumbai
21st-century Indian male actors
21st-century Indian film directors
1988 births